Jonáš Forejtek was the defending champion, having won the previous edition in 2019, but was no longer eligible to participate in junior events.

Daniel Rincón won the title, defeating Shang Juncheng in the final, 6–2, 7–6(8–6).

Seeds 
All seeds received a bye into the second round.

Draw

Finals

Top half

Section 1

Section 2

Bottom half

Section 3

Section 4

Qualifying

Seeds

Qualifiers

Draw

First qualifier

Second qualifier

Third qualifier

Fourth qualifier

Fifth qualifier

Sixth qualifier

References

External links 
 Draw

Boys' Singles
2021